Denzel Jubitana (born 6 May 1999) is a Belgian professional footballer who plays as a midfielder for Greek Super League 2 club Iraklis.

Career
Jubitana scored his first goal in the Belgian top flight on 18 August 2018 against Sint-Truiden.

On 19 July 2021, Jubitana signed a one-year contract with Roda JC Kerkrade after completing a successful trial.

On 4 February 2022, Jubitana moved to Iraklis in Greece.

Career statistics

References

External links
 Mechelen Profile

1999 births
Living people
Footballers from Antwerp
Belgian footballers
Belgian expatriate footballers
Belgian people of Surinamese descent
Belgian Pro League players
Eerste Divisie players
Super League Greece 2 players
Lierse S.K. players
K.V. Mechelen players
S.K. Beveren players
Roda JC Kerkrade players
Iraklis Thessaloniki F.C. players
Association football midfielders
Expatriate footballers in the Netherlands
Belgian expatriate sportspeople in the Netherlands
Expatriate footballers in Greece
Belgian expatriate sportspeople in Greece